Clifford B. Fagan (March 3, 1911 – January 18, 1995) was a high school basketball referee who became executive director of the National Federation of State High School Athletic Associations (NFHS) and eventually president of the Basketball Hall of Fame and board member for FIBA, the international governing body for the sport of basketball. He was born in Mankato, Minnesota.

For his contributions to the sport of basketball, including his service as a member of the board of directors for the United States Olympic Committee, Fagan was inducted into the Basketball Hall of Fame as a contributor in 1984. He was awarded the FIBA Order of Merit, in 1994.

References

External links
Basketball Hall of Fame profile
Green Bay East HS profile

1911 births
1995 deaths
Basketball referees
Sports commissioners
High school basketball coaches in Wisconsin
High school football coaches in Wisconsin
Naismith Memorial Basketball Hall of Fame inductees
Sportspeople from Mankato, Minnesota
University of Iowa alumni
University of Wisconsin–La Crosse alumni
Wisconsin–Eau Claire Blugolds football coaches